Koclířov is a municipality and village in Svitavy District in the Pardubice Region of the Czech Republic. It has about 700 inhabitants.

Administrative parts
The village of Hřebeč is an administrative part of Koclířov.

References

Villages in Svitavy District